Doumba is a small town and commune in the Cercle of Koulikoro in the Koulikoro Region of south-western Mali. It covers a surface of 250 km2 and comprises 7 villages: Doumba, Fani, Babougou, Dombana, Kossaba, Dibaro, and Sinzani. As of 2008 the commune had a population of 7557 inhabitants

References

Communes of Koulikoro Region